The Smurfs is a 2011 American 3D fantasy adventure comedy film based on the comic series of the same name created by the Belgian comics artist Peyo. It was directed by Raja Gosnell and stars Neil Patrick Harris, Jayma Mays, Sofia Vergara and Hank Azaria, with the voices of Jonathan Winters, Katy Perry, George Lopez, Anton Yelchin, Fred Armisen and Alan Cumming. It is the first Sony Pictures Animation film to blend computer animation with live-action photography, and the first of two live-action animated Smurfs feature films. 

After five years of negotiations, Jordan Kerner bought the rights in 2002, and the film entered development with Paramount Pictures and Nickelodeon Movies, until Columbia Pictures and Sony Pictures Animation obtained the film rights in 2008. Filming began in March 2010 in New York City.

The Smurfs was released by Columbia Pictures on July 29, 2011. Despite negative reviews, the film grossed $564 million worldwide against a $110 million budget, making it the ninth-highest-grossing film of 2011 and Sony Pictures Animation's most commercially successful film to date. A sequel, titled The Smurfs 2, was released on July 31, 2013.

Plot

As the Smurfs prepare for the Festival of the Blue Moon, Papa Smurf sees a vision of Clumsy Smurf reaching for a dragon wand and evil wizard Gargamel capturing the Smurfs. Shortly after, Clumsy leaves to pick smurfroot and ends up leading Gargamel into the village. The Smurfs flee and Clumsy unknowingly runs for the Forbidden Falls, with Papa, Smurfette, Grouchy, Brainy and Gutsy going after him. The Blue Moon appears and creates a vortex that spirits them to New York City. Gargamel and his pet cat Azrael follow them. 

The Smurfs end up in the apartment of Patrick and Grace Winslow, a married couple who are expecting their first child. After they explain their situation, the Winslows befriend them and allow them to stay in their apartment. The next day, needing to find a "stargazer", the Smurfs follow Patrick to his workplace at Anjelou Cosmetics, believing he is a fortune-teller. Meanwhile, Gargamel extracts Smurf essence from a lock of Smurfette's hair and impresses Patrick's boss, Odile, by using the essence to restore her elderly mother's youth. Upon recognizing Patrick, Gargamel chases him and the Smurfs into FAO Schwarz and causes chaos while trying to catch them. He is arrested and jailed, but manages to escapes the prison with the aid of a swarm of flies. 

Papa manages to calculate the night he and the others can return home, but needs to work out a spell. While the Smurfs bond with Patrick and Grace, Papa decides to search a nearby bookstore in order to locate the spell. The Smurfs find the book L’Histoire des Schtroumpfs by researcher Peyo, containing the spell to turn the moon blue. Gargamel sneaks into the bookstore and finds a dragon wand, transferring his magic into it and uses it to capture Papa. After increasing the wand's power with Smurf essence extracted from Papa's DNA, Gargamel is confronted by the entire Smurf village, having been summoned by the blue moon which opened the portal to their world. As the Smurf army battles Gargamel, Smurfette defeats Azrael and saves Papa. Gargamel is knocked out by Patrick, who drops the dragon wand in the process. Clumsy tries to catch it, and to Papa's surprise, is successful and sends Gargamel flying into the path of a bus, carrying him away. The Smurfs take their leave and bid Patrick and Grace farewell. Later, Patrick and Grace have a baby boy, whom they name Blue, and the Smurfs rebuild their village in the style of New York.

Cast

Live-action actors
 Hank Azaria as Gargamel, the arch-nemesis of the Smurfs who plots to use the Smurfs as part of a spell that would turn lead into gold. As opposed to the television show where Gargamel's goal is to use the Smurfs as the key ingredient in an alchemical formula to create the gold or eat them or destroy them, in the film he wants to capture them to serve as charms, "whose mystical essence will make his inept magic more powerful — and dangerous". To look the part of Gargamel, Azaria wore a prosthetic nose, ears, buck teeth, eyebrows, and a wig (to make the process easier, he shaved his head). The initial make-up test took three hours, but by mid-production, the process took 90 minutes to complete. Azaria was transformed over 50 times and spent approximately 130 hours in the make-up chair.
 Neil Patrick Harris as Patrick Winslow, the new VP of marketing at Anjelou Cosmetics and Grace's husband.
 Jayma Mays as Grace Winslow, Patrick's wife. 
 Sofía Vergara as Odile Anjelou, the leader of Anjelou Cosmetics who is Patrick's boss.
 Tim Gunn as Henri, Odile's assistant friend of Anjelou Cosmetics.

Joan Rivers, Liz Smith, Tom Colicchio, Olivia Palermo, and Michael Musto make cameos in the film at a fictional Anjelou cosmetics product launch.

Voice actors

 Jonathan Winters as Papa Smurf, the leader of the Smurfs. Winters previously provided the voice of Grandpa Smurf in the 1980s cartoon series. He and Frank Welker are the only original cast members from the TV series who returned for the film.
 Katy Perry as Smurfette, the female of the Smurfs. About gaining the voice role, Perry said: "They had done a blind test where they took certain voices from previous interviews and matched them with the character. They liked my voice without even knowing who it was, and when they found out it was me, they thought that would work out. My personality was just a plus!"
 Anton Yelchin as Clumsy Smurf, the dimwitted but friendly smurf. Yelchin commented on his character's personality change from the cartoons series saying, "I was familiar with Clumsy from the TV series, where he had that Southern twang. I went back and watched that, and then Raja, Jordan and I talked about it. We decided to make Clumsy a little simpler, a little sweeter. His voice is pitched higher than my normal speaking voice – it's full of joy, optimism, and enthusiasm for life. Clumsy isn't trying to mess anything up for anybody — he's just clumsy, and actually, he's tired of being clumsy".
 Fred Armisen as Brainy Smurf, the smartest Smurf, below Papa Smurf. Quentin Tarantino was up to voice him, but dropped out.
 Alan Cumming as Gutsy Smurf, one of three Smurfs created specifically for the film and who is Scottish, wears a kilt and has sideburns. The character is also described as the "action-hero" of the film.
 George Lopez as Grouchy Smurf, a smurf who is always grouchy. To prepare for his role of being "grouchy", Lopez did not drink coffee, made sure he had bad breath and picked the busiest time to get to the studio.
 Jeff Foxworthy as Handy Smurf, a hard-working smurf.
 Paul Reubens as Jokey Smurf, a smurf who plays pranks on others.
 Gary Basaraba as Hefty Smurf, a strong smurf with a tattoo of a heart. 
 John Oliver as Vanity Smurf, a smurf who is obsessed with his looks.
 Kenan Thompson as Greedy Smurf, a smurf who loves smurfberries.
 B. J. Novak as Baker Smurf, a smurf who loves to bake.
 Joel McCrary as Farmer Smurf, a smurf who is a farmer.
 Wolfgang Puck as Chef Smurf, a smurf who loves to cook.
 John Kassir as Crazy Smurf, the alarm for the village and the second Smurf created specifically for the film
 Tom Kane as Narrator Smurf, a smurf with a deep narrator voice and the third Smurf created specifically for the film.
 Frank Welker as Azrael, Gargamel's cat. Welker provided the voice of Hefty Smurf and other characters in the 1980s cartoon series. Four orange tabby cats played the role of Azrael with some scenes being created with CGI by Tippett Studio. Animal trainer Larry Madrid had a "rare Burma cat" that was used to educe snarls from the other cats since they did not like him.

Production

Development
In 1997, producer Jordan Kerner sent the first "of a series of letters" to The Smurfs licensing agent Lafig Belgium expressing interest in making a feature film. It was not until 2002 after a draft of Kerner's film adaptation of Charlotte's Web was read by Peyo's heirs, that they accepted Kerner's offer. Peyo's daughter Véronique Culliford and family had wanted to make a Smurfs film for years and said that Kerner was the first person to pitch a film that shared their "vision and enthusiasm". Kerner soon began developing the 3-D CGI feature film with Paramount Pictures and Nickelodeon Movies. In 2006, Kerner said the film was planned to be a trilogy and would explain more of Gargamel's backstory. He stated, "We'll learn [more] about Gargamel and Smurf Soup and how all that began and what really goes on in that castle. What his backstory really was. There's an all-powerful wizard... there's all sorts of things that get revealed as we go along". Early animation footage was leaked on the internet in early 2008. The filmmakers were allowed to create three new Smurfs for the film – Narrator, Crazy, and Gutsy.

In June 2008, it was announced that Columbia Pictures and Sony Pictures Animation obtained the film rights from Lafig Belgium. Kerner said the current project started with Sony during a conversation with the chairman-CEO Michael Lynton, who grew up watching The Smurfs in the Netherlands. Kerner explained, "He relished them as I do and suggested that it should be a live-action/CG film. Amy Pascal felt equally that there was potentially a series of films in the making". Shrek 2 writers, J. David Stem and David N. Weiss wrote the screenplay along with Zookeeper writers Jay Scherick and David Ronn; Stem and Weiss also wrote the story. Raja Gosnell directed. Quentin Tarantino was in talks to play Brainy Smurf, however, these did not pan out.

Filming and animation
On a budget of $110 million, principal photography began in New York City on March 26, 2010. In May, scenes were filmed in Manhattan's SoHo neighborhood. That month, scenes were shot all night for five nights in a row at F.A.O. Schwartz toy store. Production was temporarily halted after a worker fell 30 feet from a set at the toy store on Fifth Avenue and 58th Street; he later recovered in a hospital. Other locations used for filming were Belvedere Castle, the Russian Tea Room, Rockefeller Center, and Brooklyn's Prospect Park. A two-thirds-scale replica of the Belvedere Castle was built with wooden grates as floors (to create additional contrast). Gargamel's dungeon under the Belvedere Castle, which included the "Smurfalator", was built on a soundstage. It took three months to build because some parts were hard to come by. Production eventually found the rare parts at garage sales, flea markets, on eBay and Craigslist.

In order to help the Smurfs' animators during post-production, cinematographer Phil Meheux and his team would light up a scene where the Smurfs would be digitally added using 7 and one half-inch tall models to stand in during set-up and rehearsals. He explained, "We can then position the light so that it falls right. The actors know where the Smurf will be when it is animated later, so their eyelines will match. Then we can take out the model and shoot the scene, and they look quite real, fitting the real backing that we're giving them. It looks like they're part of the surroundings". Also during the process the Imageworks visual effects team used a new camera system to precisely record the on-set lighting, so it could be applied later in the computer. When time came to film a scene that would include actors and Smurfs, each Smurf was represented by a different colored dot and the
actors had to remember which dot was which Smurf. The Smurfs characters were created during post-production by 268 Sony Pictures Imageworks employees who spent around 358,000 hours animating. Character designer Allen Battino, a long time Kerner collaborator, was brought in to redesign the characters for CGI.

Release

The film had its worldwide premiere on June 16, 2011, in Júzcar, a small village in Spain. To celebrate the release, the residents painted entire village, including church and other historical buildings in blue. Twelve local painters used 4,000 litres of blue to transform traditionally white Júzcar into the world's first Smurf Village. Although Sony vowed to restore the village to its former look, six months after the premiere, the residents voted to keep the colour, which had brought more than 80,000 tourists to Júzcar.

In the United States, the film was meant to be released on December 17, 2010, but it was delayed to July 29, 2011. It was then further delayed to August 3, 2011, before being moved up to the original release date of July 29, 2011. Sony teamed up with marketing partners in the United States, Canada, and the United Kingdom to promote the film through McDonald's Happy Meals and Post Foods brand cereal during the summer of 2011.

Home media
The Smurfs and Friends with Benefits are the first Sony films compatible with the UltraViolet system, which enables users to access films on any web-connected device.
The film was re-released on Ultra HD Blu-ray on March 28, 2017.

Reception

Box office
The Smurfs grossed $142.6 million in the United States and Canada, along with $421.1 million in foreign markets, for a worldwide total of $563.7 million. Documents from the Sony Pictures hack revealed the film turned a profit of $83 million.

The film opened on approximately 5,300 screens at 3,395 locations, with 2,042 locations being 3D-enabled theaters. On July 28, 2011, Exhibitor Relations predicted The Smurfs would rank third its opening weekend with $24 million, but analyst Jeff Bock added that the film "could be a dark horse and do better than expected". That same day, John Young of Entertainment Weekly predicted a $32 million opening and a second-place ranking behind Cowboys & Aliens. He also stated that the ticket service Fandango reported that the film was leading in ticket sales. The Smurfs came in number one on Friday making an $13.2 million, ahead of Cowboys & Aliens $13 million. According to Sony's research, 65% of The Smurfs audience was parents (40%) and their children under 12 years old (25%). Overall the audience breakdown was reported as 64% female and 55% age 25 years and older.

Estimates later showed that Cowboys & Aliens and The Smurfs were tied at the number one spot for the weekend with $36.2 million each. However, actual figures showed Cowboys & Aliens won the weekend with $36.4 million just beating The Smurfs $35.6 million. The Smurfs opening was still stronger than anticipated since some box office analysts predicted that it would open below $30 million. For its second weekend the film remained at number two with Rise of the Planet of the Apes taking Cowboys & Aliens spot. It made $20.7 million (41% being from 3D showings), a 42% decrease from its opening weekend.

The Smurfs opened to $4.4 million from seven territories with Spain taking in $4 million of that total. On its second weekend it expanded to 42 territories, taking first place in most of its markets and grossing $45.2 million. Among the markets the film opened in first place were Brazil ($6.65 million), France ($5.93 million), Mexico ($5.53 million) Germany ($5.43 million). The film stayed number one at the international box office for the next seven weeks.

Critical reception
Review aggregator Rotten Tomatoes reports that 21% of 117 critics have given the film a positive review, with a rating average of 4.01/10. The site's critical consensus states, "The Smurfs assembles an undeniably talented cast of voice actors and live-action stars—then crushes them beneath a blue mound of lowest-common-denominator kiddie fare." Metacritic, which assigns a weighted average score out of 100 to reviews from mainstream critics, gave the film an average score of 30 based on 22 reviews, which indicates "generally unfavorable reviews". Audiences polled by CinemaScore gave the film an average grade of "A−" on an A+ to F scale.

Keith Staskiewicz of Entertainment Weekly gave the film a D+ saying, "The Smurfs may be blue, but their movie is decidedly green, recycling discarded bits from other celluloid Happy Meals like Alvin and the Chipmunks, Garfield, and Hop into something half animated, half live action, and all careful studio calculation". Michael Rechtshaffen of The Hollywood Reporter gave the film a negative review saying, "This numbingly generic Smurf-out-of-water-tale is strictly for those who stand closer to three apples tall." Ending the review he said, "Having previously helmed two Scooby-Doos and a Beverly Hills Chihuahua, director Raja Gosnell could probably have done this one in his sleep, which is likely where all but the most attentive of caregivers will helplessly find themselves drifting."

Roger Moore of the Orlando Sentinel gave it two out of four stars saying, "The good news about the big-screen 3D version of The Smurfs that's opening at your neighborhood multiplex is that it's not the insipid and some say "socialist" Smurfs you remember from 1980s TV". He called the slapstick "very small-kid friendly" and considered the adult-friendly jokes "pretty mild stuff". He closed his review saying, "Yeah, the Smurfs are still sickeningly sweet and upbeat. But if you've got kids, it's not nearly as torturous to sit through as you might have feared". Justin Chang of Variety described the film as "adorable and annoying, patently unnecessary yet kinda sweet" and calling it "a calculated commercial enterprise with little soul but an appreciable amount of heart". He said, "The script does wink knowingly in the direction of attentive adults".

San Francisco Chronicles Peter Hartlaub gave the film a mixed review. He said The Smurfs is a "rare movie where the worst parts are in the promos". He called Harris' performance an "honest effort in a thankless role" but said that Azaria as Gargamel "Hidden under prosthetics, [Hank Azaria] compensates for his lack of good lines and repulsive makeup by overacting". He closed his review saying, "Harris, mostly acting against Marshmallow Peep-sized animated creations, is convincing and likable throughout. No doubt he will poke fun at his participation in this film the next time he's hosting an awards show, but don't be fooled. It takes a good actor to save a bad movie". Ty Burr of The Boston Globe criticized the CGI used on the cat, the use of 3D by calling it "needless" and Lopez's voice as Grouchy. He called the Smurf rap the worst part of the film. However, Burr echoed Harlaub's praise for Harris' performance by saying, "Harris manages to class up whatever he touches, even if the sight of him repeatedly hitting himself with an umbrella probably won't go on the career highlight reel". About Azaria, he said, "[Azaria] gets to put on a baldy wig and fake buck-teeth and overact as broadly as he can. A little of this goes a long way unless you're 6 years old, which is the point". He also added that Sofia Vergara "shares the screenplay's confusion as to what, exactly, she's doing here".

USA Todays Scott Bowles enjoyed Azaria's performance calling him "the human standout" and saying "He and his distrusting cat, Azrael, steal scenes". He also called Jonathan Winters "wonderful" as Papa Smurf. Neil Genzlinger of The New York Times said Azaria was "quite funny". About the film's content, he said "Those grown-up winks, along with an array of New York locations, make The Smurfs a surprisingly tolerable film for adults. As for their children, well, who knows with kids? But at least the writers have cleverly built in enough Smurfology that today's youngsters will be able to get the basics of the blue universe". Betsy Sharkey from the Los Angeles Times gave the film a negative review saying, "Director Raja Gosnell starts with the innocence but then loses his way in trying to pull off the hipster spin the script by J. David Stem, David N. Weiss, Jay Scherick and David Ronn is shooting for." and "There are many good actors wasted as voices—Alan Cumming, Fred Armisen and Winters among them—and in the flesh, though the greatest disservice is to Azaria".

Accolades
NewNowNext Awards
 Next Must See Movie (Nominated)

38th People's Choice Awards
 Favorite Animated Movie Voice: Katy Perry (Nominated)

2012 Kids' Choice Awards
 Favorite Movie (Nominated)
 Favorite Movie Actress: Sofia Vergara (Nominated)
 Favorite Voice in an Animated Film: Katy Perry (Won)

Video games
 The Smurfs, a Nintendo DS video game was released on July 19, 2011.
 The Smurfs Dance Party, a Wii video game was released on July 19, 2011.

Sequels

The Smurfs 2

A sequel, titled The Smurfs 2, was released on July 31, 2013. Director Raja Gosnell and producer Jordan Kerner returned, along with all the main cast. New cast includes Christina Ricci, J. B. Smoove, and Brendan Gleeson. In the sequel, Gargamel creates a couple of evil Smurf-like creatures called the Naughties to harness the magical Smurf-essence.
When he discovers that only a real Smurf can give him what he wants and that only Smurfette can turn the Naughties into the real Smurfs, Gargamel kidnaps Smurfette and takes her to Paris. Papa, Clumsy, Grouchy, and Vanity return to the human world and seek the help of their friends Patrick and Grace Winslow to rescue Smurfette from Gargamel and when the Smurfs gets captured. Like its predecessor, The Smurfs 2 was met with critically negative reviews, and it earned $347 million.

Cancelled third film and reboot
On May 10, 2012, two weeks after Columbia Pictures and Sony Pictures Animation announced production of The Smurfs 2, Variety reported that writers Karey Kirkpatrick and Chris Poche were developing a script for The Smurfs 3, which was set for release on July 24, 2015, and later rescheduled for August 14, 2015. In March 2014, Sony announced that it will reboot the series with a completely computer-animated film. Directed by Kelly Asbury, the reboot titled Smurfs: The Lost Village, was released on April 7, 2017, which received mixed reviews from critics, but was considered an improvement over the live-action films.

References

Further reading

External links

 
 
 
 
 
 
 

2011 films
2011 3D films
2011 computer-animated films
2010s children's comedy films
2010s fantasy comedy films
American films with live action and animation
American children's animated comedy films
American fantasy comedy films
Animated films based on comics
2010s children's fantasy films
Columbia Pictures animated films
Columbia Pictures films
Sony Pictures Animation films
Films scored by Heitor Pereira
Films based on Belgian comics
Films directed by Raja Gosnell
Films set in the Middle Ages
Films set in New York City
Films shot in New York City
Films with screenplays by David N. Weiss
The Smurfs in film
Films set in 2011
Films about parallel universes
Films about wizards
3D animated films
2011 comedy films
2010s English-language films
2010s American films